Takhini Hot Springs (Takhini Hotspring) (tɑːkiːniː) is a natural hot springs located just outside the border of Whitehorse, Yukon ( from the city centre). It is a locally run business which incorporates two pools at different temperatures and has a campground with over 80 sites. The site has been in operation for more than 100 years and is one of the most popular Yukon tourist attractions.

Water 

The pool is divided into two sections: the hot side and the cool side. Takhini Hot Springs is fortunate to contain no sulphurous odour as is common to most hot springs.

Based on geothermal research, the hot springs water comes from intersecting faults in the earth. Rain water and snow from the mountains go deep into the earth, where the water is heated and the minerals dissolve. The water then returns to the surface and out of the ground in a small crater (the source). It is one of the only hot springs in the world that is unfiltered.

According to tests, it has taken a minimum of 60 years for the water in the pools to come from the ground into the source.

History 

Takhini Hot Springs has a long history in Yukon. It used to be called Jim Boss' Bathtub, after the famous First Nations Chief whose village was on the marsh, maintained a bathtub there. Used by the First Nations for centuries, the site was known for natural hot water flowing from the ground. In 1902, Wiliam Puckett and A.R. Gordon submitted the original application for the lease of the property; they purchased the land for $2 per acre in 1907.  They commercially promoted the springs for their therapeutic value. The first pool was made of wood and canvas and was built in the 1940s for the use of the United States Army while they constructed the Alaska Highway. In 1950 a concrete pool was built and that was later replaced by the existing pool and building in the 1970s. In 2008, many renovations were undertaken to improve the pool's facilities. The facility is constantly being upgraded and improved, particularly following a rezoning of the Yukon area.

It is considered an ideal place to view the Northern Lights.

Mineral content of water:

Hair freezing competition
The resort holds an annual contest called The International Hair Freezing Contest which started in 2011. The most recent contest, in 2020, received 288 entries for the five category competition. Categories include the Best Male, Best Female, Best Group, Nongshim's People's Choice and Tim Horton's Most Creative. The winner in each category receives CAD$2000 and free hot spring passes. To enter participants have to come to the Takhini Hot Pools between the months of December and March, only on days when the temperature is below .

References

Hot springs of Canada
 Hot
Tourist attractions in Yukon
Whitehorse